Tongguanshan District is a district under the administration of Tongling City in, Anhui Province, People's Republic of China. The district's postal code is 244000.It was merged with  Shizishan District to form Tongguan District in October 2015.

Administrative divisions
Tongguanshan District administers six streets. These include Changjianglu Street, Tongguanshan Street, Yangjiashan Street, Shichenglu Street, Saobagou Street, and Henggang Street.

County-level divisions of Anhui
Tongling